Done is the debut album by the German/Danish noise rock band 18th Dye, originally released in 1994.

Personnel
Sebastian Büttrich – vocals / Guitar
Heike Rädeker – vocals / Bass guitar
Piet Bendtsen – drums

References

External links

1994 debut albums
18th Dye albums
Albums produced by Iain Burgess